The 2001 All-Ireland Senior Hurling Championship was the 114th staging of Ireland's premier hurling knock-out competition. Tipperary won the championship, beating Galway 2-18 to 2-15 in the final at Croke Park, Dublin.

Calendar

Format

The All-Ireland Senior Hurling Championship was run on a provincial basis as usual.  All games were played on a knockout basis whereby once a team lost they were eliminated from the championship.  The format for the All-Ireland series of games ran as follows: 
 The winners of the Munster Championship advanced directly to one of the All-Ireland semi-finals.  
 The winners of the Leinster Championship advanced directly to the second All-Ireland semi-final.
 The winners of the Ulster Championship advanced directly to one of the All-Ireland quarter-finals where they were drawn to play Galway.  The winners of this game would later play the Leinster champions in the All-Ireland semi-final.
 The Munster runners-up were drawn to play the Leinster runners-up in the second All-Ireland quarter-final.  The winners of this game would later play the Munster champions in the All-Ireland semi-final.

Fixtures

Leinster Senior Hurling Championship

Munster Senior Hurling Championship

Ulster Senior Hurling Championship

Desipte the Foot and Mouth and London withdraw from the football championship they remained in the Hurling championship at the time.

All-Ireland Senior Hurling Championship

{{8TeamBracket | RD1=Quarter-FinalsJuly 29 | RD2=Semi-FinalsAugust 12 / 18 / 19 | RD3=FinalSeptember 9 |
| RD1-seed1=*| RD1-seed2=| RD1-seed3=| RD1-seed4=| RD1-seed5=*| RD1-seed6=*| RD1-seed7=*| RD1-seed8=|
| RD1-team1= Tipperary
| RD1-team2= 
| RD1-score1=
| RD1-score2=
| RD1-team3= Wexford
| RD1-team4= Limerick
| RD1-score3=4-10
| RD1-score4=2-15
| RD1-team5= Galway
| RD1-team6= Derry
| RD1-score5=4-23
| RD1-score6=1-11
| RD1-team7= Kilkenny
| RD1-team8= 
| RD1-score7=
| RD1-score8=
| RD2-team1= Tipperary
| RD2-team2= Wexford| RD2-score1=1-16 3-12(R)| RD2-score2=3-10 0-10(R)
| RD2-team3= Galway| RD2-team4= Kilkenny
| RD2-score3=2-15| RD2-score4=1-13
| RD3-team1= Tipperary| RD3-team2= Galway
| RD3-score1=2-18'| RD3-score2=2-15
}}
Note: * = Provincial Champion, (R) = Replay

Championship statistics

Miscellaneous

 Desipte on London's withdraw from the football championship due to Foot and Mouth crisis in England they decided to stay in the Hurling championship.

Top scorers

Season

Single game

References
 Corry, Eoghan, The GAA Book of Lists (Hodder Headline Ireland, 2005).
 Donegan, Des, The Complete Handbook of Gaelic Games'' (DBA Publications Limited, 2005).

External links
 All-Ireland Senior Hurling Championship 2001 Results
 Official GAA Website

All-Ireland Senior Hurling Championships
All-Ireland Senior Hurling Championship